Châlons may refer to:

France 
Châlons-en-Champagne (formerly Châlons-sur-Marne), a town in Marne département
Camp de Châlons, a temporary firing range near the French town, set up to host events for the 1924 Paris Summer Olympics
Roman Catholic Diocese of Châlons, with its seat in Châlons-en-Champagne
Battle of Châlons (274), fought between the Roman Empire and the Gallic Empire
Battle of the Catalaunian Plains (451), also called the Battle of Châlons, fought between the Huns and the Romans
CO Châlons, a defunct football club from the town
Communauté d'agglomération de Châlons-en-Champagne, communauté d’agglomération centred on the town
Châlons-sur-Vesle, a village in the Marne département
Châlons-du-Maine, village in the Mayenne département
Chalon (formerly Châlons), a village in the Isère département

See also
Chalon (disambiguation)